John Dennis Fitzgerald (February 3, 1906 – May 30, 1988) was an American author, most notable for The Great Brain series of children's books.

Biography 
Fitzgerald was born in Price, Utah, the son of an Irish Catholic father and a Scandinavian mother who was a member of the Church of Jesus Christ of Latter-day Saints. He had two older brothers, Thomas (1902-1988; the basis for the character known as the Great Brain) and William; two younger brothers, Charles and Gerald; and an older sister, Isabelle (known as "Belle").

He left Utah in 1925, at the age of 18, and held a variety of jobs, including playing in a jazz band, working at a bank and working for a steel company.

Fitzgerald published his first novel, Papa Married a Mormon, in 1955. Other novels for adults about late nineteenth and early twentieth century Utah followed. Fitzgerald had many stories published in magazines, and he also co-wrote two textbooks about creative writing.

In the 1960s, he turned his attention to books for children, writing the highly successful The Great Brain series, in which his characters are loosely based on people from his own family and community, including himself. The Great Brain is based on his brother, Tom. Fitzgerald changed many family details in the Great Brain series. He omitted his oldest sibling Isabelle and his younger brothers Charles and Gerald, gave his older brother William the name Sweyn, and invented a family custom of giving sons the middle name Dennis (his older brothers were William J. and Thomas N., not Sweyn D. and Tom D.) The Great Brain novels are structured like a collection of short stories, in which Tom either swindles people and then rationalizes it by claiming it was to teach them a lesson, or solves an important problem for the community. There are eight books in the series (one of which was published posthumously).

Bibliography

The Great Brain series

 The Great Brain (Dial Press, 1967)
 More Adventures of the Great Brain (Dial Press, 1969)
 Me and My Little Brain (Dial Press, 1971)
 The Great Brain at the Academy (Dial Press, 1972)
 The Great Brain Reforms (Dial Press, 1973)
 The Return of the Great Brain (Dial Press, 1974)
 The Great Brain Does It Again (Dial Press, 1976)
 The Great Brain Is Back (Dial Press, 1995) — published from loose notes after the author's death

Other books 
 Papa Married a Mormon (Prentice-Hall, 1955) — unofficially co-authored with Fitzgerald's sister Belle Fitzgerald Empey
 Mamma's Boarding House (W.H. Allen, 1958) — sequel to Papa Married a Mormon
 Uncle Will and the Fitzgerald Curse (Bobbs-Merrill Company, 1961)
 (with Robert C. Meredith) The Professional Story Writer and His Art (Crowell, 1963)
 (with Robert C. Meredith) Structuring Your Novel: From Basic Idea to Finished Manuscript (HarperCollins Publishers, 1972)
 Brave Buffalo Fighter (Bethlehem Books, 1973)
 Private Eye (T. Nelson, 1974)

References

External links

 Histories of Carbon County, Utah 
Finding Fitzgerald blog
 

1906 births
1988 deaths
American children's writers
People from Price, Utah
Writers from Utah
American people of Danish descent
American people of Irish descent